Vladas Byla was a Lithuanian footballer. He played in two matches for the Lithuania national football team in 1924. He was also part of Lithuania's squad for the football tournament at the 1924 Summer Olympics, but he did not play in any matches.

References

External links
 

Year of birth missing
Year of death missing
Lithuanian footballers
Lithuania international footballers
Place of birth missing
Association football forwards
Olympic footballers of Lithuania
Footballers at the 1924 Summer Olympics